Frank Sheldon Harden (October 18, 1920 – January 24, 2005) was an American football player and coach. He served as the head football coach at California Polytechnic State University in San Luis Obispo, California from 1962 to 1967, compiling a record of 17–42. He also served as Cal Poly's first wrestling coach.

Head coaching record

Football

References

External links
 

1920 births
2005 deaths
Cal Poly Mustangs football coaches
Santa Clara Broncos football players
College wrestling coaches in the United States
People from Plumas County, California
Players of American football from California